British cuisine is the specific set of cooking traditions and practices associated with the United Kingdom. Historically, British cuisine meant "unfussy dishes made with quality local ingredients, matched with simple sauces to accentuate flavour, rather than disguise it". International recognition of British cuisine was historically limited to the full breakfast and the Christmas dinner. However, Celtic agriculture and animal breeding produced a wide variety of foodstuffs for indigenous Celts. Wine and words such as beef and mutton were brought to Britain by the Normans while Anglo-Saxon England developed meat and savoury herb stewing techniques before the practice became common in Europe. The Norman conquest introduced exotic spices into Great Britain in the Middle Ages.

The pub is an important aspect of British culture and cuisine, and is often the focal point of local communities. Referred to as their "local" by regulars, pubs are typically chosen for their proximity to home or work, the availability of a particular beer or ale or a good selection, good food, a social atmosphere, the presence of friends and acquaintances, and the availability of pub games such as darts or snooker. Pubs will often screen televised sports events. In recent years, some pubs have adapted to a culture in which fewer young people enjoy drinking alcohol or will not consume it in the same quantities as in the past.

New foodstuffs have arrived over the millennia, from sausages in Roman times, and rice, sugar, oranges, and spices from Asia in the Middle Ages, to New World beans and potatoes in the Columbian exchange after 1492, and spicy curry sauces from India in the 18th and 19th centuries. Many vegetables seen today in British cuisine such as cabbage, peas, and cherries, were also brought as crops by the Romans.

More recently, Indian cuisine has brought wide variety of food to Britain and was not only consumed in its native form, but was adapted to suit British tastes, dishes such as chicken tikka masala, balti dishes, kedgeree, mulligatawny soup and coronation chicken all took their inspiration from the food brought to Britain from India.

Traditional British dishes include full breakfast, roast dinner, fish and chips, and shepherd's pie. Traditional British desserts include trifle, scones, apple pie and Victoria sponge cake. British cuisine has distinctive national varieties in the form of English, Scottish, Welsh and Northern Irish cuisines. Modern British cuisine has also been strongly influenced by other cuisines from around the world, and has in turn strongly influenced the cuisines of many other cultures around the world.

History

Beginnings 
Bread from mixed cereal grains was first made around 3700 BC in Britain.

Cider is an ancient British beverage. The first recorded reference to cider dates back to Julius Caesar’s first attempt to invade Britain in 55 BCE where he found the native Celts fermenting crabapples. He would take the discovery back through continental Europe with his retreating troops.

In Roman times, further foods were introduced, such as sausages, rabbit, herbs and spices from further south in the Roman empire such as chives and coriander, and wine, which was produced in Britain in vineyards as far north as Northamptonshire and Lincolnshire.

Prior to and after the Norman conquest of England in 1066, British food mostly consisted of vegetables, cereals and mutton.

In the Middle Ages, the Anglo-Saxons introduced bacon to Britain sometime during the 1st millennium AD. The Norman conquest reintroduced spices and continental influences into Great Britain in the Middle Ages; oranges arrived in the late 13th century, sugar cane in the 14th, and carrots in the 15th century.

Early Modern to 19th century 
With the Western exploration of the New World in 1492, the Columbian exchange led to the arrival in Europe of many new foods, including refined sugar, the potato, the banana and chocolate. The growth in worldwide trade brought foods and beverages from the Old World too, including tea and coffee. Developments in plant breeding greatly increased the number of fruit and vegetable varieties.

The turkey was introduced to Britain in the 16th century, but its use for Christmas dinner, with Christmas pudding for dessert, was a 19th-century innovation. Other   traditional British dishes, like fish and chips and the full breakfast, rose to prominence in the Victorian era; while they have a status in British culture, they are not necessarily a large part of many people's diets.

20th century 

During the World Wars of the 20th century difficulties of food supply were countered by measures such as rationing. Rationing continued for nearly ten years after the Second World War, and in some aspects was stricter than during wartime, so that a whole generation was raised without access to many previously common ingredients, possibly contributing to a decline of British cuisine. Writing in the 1960s about British cuisine in the 1950s, the Good Food Guide called the food of the 1950s "intolerable" due to a shortage of real ingredients such as butter, cream or meat. A hunger for cooking from abroad was satisfied by writers such as Elizabeth David, who from 1950 produced evocative books, starting with A Book of Mediterranean Food, whose ingredients were then often impossible to find in Britain.

By the 1960s foreign holidays, and foreign-style restaurants in Britain, widened the popularity of foreign cuisine. This movement was assisted by celebrity chefs – on television and in their books – such as Fanny Cradock, Clement Freud, Robert Carrier, Keith Floyd, Gary Rhodes, Delia Smith, Gordon Ramsay,  Ainsley Harriott, Nigella Lawson, Simon Hopkinson, Nigel Slater and Jamie Oliver.

From the 1970s, the availability and range of good quality fresh products increased, and the British population became more willing to vary its diet. Modern British cooking draws on influences from Mediterranean, and more recently, Middle Eastern and Asian cuisines. In the 1990s and early 2000s, a form of "virtuous eclecticism" emerged in discourse around British cuisine, arguing that British cuisine can be distinguished by its apparently unique ability to draw from other cultures.

Furthermore, from the 1970s there was an increased push to recognise a distinctly British cuisine. The English Tourist Board campaigned for restaurants to include more British historical and regional dishes on their menus. In the 1980s, in the face of globalisation - which made foreign cuisines and imported produce more widely available in the UK - a style of cooking known as Modern British Cooking emerged in an effort to construct a national cuisine for the tourist industry. This new style of cooking focused on the garden and vegetables.

Anglo-Indian cuisine

In the 18th and 19th centuries, the Colonial British Empire began to be influenced by India's elaborate food tradition with strong spices and herbs. Traditional British cuisine was modified with the addition of Indian-style spices and ingredients such as rice, creating dishes such as kedgeree (1790) and mulligatawny soup (1791).

Curry became popular in Britain by the 1970s, when some restaurants that originally catered mainly to Indians found their clientele diversifying. Chicken tikka masala, a mildly spiced dish in a creamy sauce, invented around 1971 in Britain, has been called "a true British national dish."

21st century 

British culinary preferences have continued to evolve in the 21st century. Many people in a 2021 survey had never eaten such traditional favourites as toad in the hole, spotted dick, Scotch eggs, black pudding, or bubble and squeak, and a minority did not believe these dishes existed.

In September 2022, Debora Robertson wrote in the Daily Telegraph that the 21st century has seen 'a revolution in British dining, fine and otherwise'.

Characteristics 
According to Warde, three definitions of British cuisine in response to globalisation predominate. Modern British Cooking draws on Britain's culinary history to create a new British traditional cuisine. Virtuous eclecticism highlights the melting pot of different national cuisines present in the UK. Another draws on popular, common products to produce a form of historical continuity between historical and modern cuisines.

Internationally, British food tends to have a perception of being "terrible": bland, soggy, overcooked and visually unappealing. The reason for this is debated. One popular reason is that British culinary traditions were strong before the mid-20th century, when British cuisine suffered due to wartime rationing. A lot of myths about British food originate from this period. An alternative hypothesis is that British people are "too repressed" to cook properly and that British culture is not adept to serving lavish meals.

Popular dishes 
According to a survey by YouGov, the most popular British food is the Yorkshire pudding, which over 85% of Brits say they like, closely followed by Sunday roasts and fish and chips. The least popular was jellied eels, which only 6% of those who had tried it liked. Scones and Victoria sponge are the most popular sweet foods, while the Deep-fried Mars bar is the least popular.

Curries are a large part of British cuisine, with cooks in the United Kingdom creating curries distinct to the country. Chicken tikka masala, which comprises 15 percent of orders in British Indian restaurants, was called "a true British national dish" by the Foreign Secretary Robin Cook in 2001. Generally, British curries are thicker and sweeter than their Indian counterparts. Furthermore, curry sauces in Britain are interchangeable between meats, while in India different meats have non-interchangeable sauces. A key ingredient to a British curry is curry powder, a "British concoction" of spices.

National cuisines

English 

English cuisine has distinctive attributes of its own, but also shares much with wider British cuisine, partly through the importation of ingredients and ideas from North America, China, and India during the time of the British Empire and as a result of post-war immigration. Some traditional meals, such as sausages, bread and cheese, roasted and stewed meats, meat and game pies, boiled vegetables and broths, and freshwater and saltwater fish have ancient origins. The 14th-century English cookbook, the Forme of Cury, contains recipes for these, and dates from the royal court of Richard II.

Northern Irish 

Northern Ireland's culinary heritage has its roots in the staple diet of generations of farming families—bread and potatoes.  Historically, limited availability of ingredients and low levels of immigration resulted in restricted variety and relative isolation from wider international culinary influences. The 21st century has seen significant improvements in local cuisine, characterised by an increase in the variety, quantity and quality of gastropubs and restaurants. There are currently three Michelin star restaurants in Northern Ireland, both of which specialise in traditional dishes made using local ingredients.

Scottish 

Scottish cuisine has closer links to Scandinavia and France than English cuisine has. Traditional Scottish dishes include bannock, brose, cullen skink, Dundee cake, haggis, marmalade, porridge, and Scotch broth. The cuisines of the northern islands of Orkney and Shetland are distinctively different from that of mainland Scotland. The nation is known for its whiskies.

Welsh 

Welsh cuisine in the Middle Ages was limited in range; Gerald of Wales, chaplain to Henry II, wrote after an 1188 tour that "The whole population lives almost entirely on oats and the produce of their herds, milk, cheese and butter. You must not expect a variety of dishes from a Welsh kitchen, and there are no highly-seasoned titbits to whet your appetite."
The cuisine includes recipes for Welsh lamb, and dishes such as cawl, Welsh rarebit, laverbread, Welsh cakes, bara brith and Glamorgan sausage.

International cuisines 
The UK has had availability of a large variety of foreign cuisines since the post-war period. In 1970, the Good Food Guide stated: "London now has a richer variety of restaurants than any other city on Earth". In 1995, the Good Food Guide argued that the fusion of national cuisines "could only happen here", as Britain is a melting pot without as distinct of a national cuisine as other such countries.

See also 

 Channel Islands cuisine
 Cuisine of the Thirteen Colonies
 Culture of the United Kingdom
 List of British breads
 List of British desserts
 List of United Kingdom food and drink products with protected status

References

Further reading 

 Addyman, Mary; Wood, Laura; Yiannitsaros, Christopher (eds). (2017) Food, Drink, and the Written Word in Britain, 1820–1945, Taylor & Francis.
 Brears, P. (2008) Cooking and Dining in Medieval England 
 Burnett, John. "Plenty and Want: The Social History of English Diet", History Today (April 1964) 14.3 pp. 223–233. 
 Burnett, John. (1979) Plenty and want: a social history of diet in England from 1815 to the present day, 2nd ed. 
 Burnett, John. (2016) England eats out: a social history of eating out in England from 1830 to the present, Routledge.
 
 Collins, E. J. T. (1975) "Dietary change and cereal consumption in Britain in the nineteenth century." Agricultural History Review 23.2, pp. 97–115.
 
 
 Green, Kate & Bryan, Melanie (2020) "Around Britain in 50 Foods"; in: Country Life; February 12, 2020, pp. 36–41.
 Harris, Bernard; Floud, Roderick; Hong, Sok Chul. (2015) "How many calories? Food availability in England and Wales in the eighteenth and nineteenth centuries". Research in Economic History.. pp. 111–191.
 
 
 
 Woolgar. C. N. (2016) The Culture of Food in England, 1200–1500 Yale University Press.

Historiography

 Otter, Chris. "The British Nutrition Transition and its Histories", History Compass 10#11 (2012): pp. 812–825,

External links

 Food Stories – Explore a century of revolutionary change in UK food culture on the British Library's Food Stories website
 George Orwell's essay "In Defence of English Cooking"